Bracholin  is a village in the administrative district of Gmina Wągrowiec, within Wągrowiec County, Greater Poland Voivodeship, in west-central Poland.

In 1216 Światosław (from the Pałuki family), comes, bequeathed Bracholin to the closter in Łekno.

References

Bracholin